Afak Sports Club, is an Iraqi football club based in Afak, Al-Qādisiyyah. The team competes in the Iraq Division One.

History
Afak Club was established in 1991 by some athletes in Al Diwaniyah Governorate, and after reaching the Iraq Division One, it participated seven times in the final rounds of qualifying for the Premier League, but did not qualify. In the 2020–21 season, the team managed to reach the third-place match after playing 13 matches without losing, but they lost in the match to determine the third place against Samarra 1-0, from a penalty kick, and for the eighth time, they were close to qualifying, without qualifying to play in the Premier League.

Stadium
On May 31, 2016, Afak Stadium was opened in the presence of sports and government figures. The stadium  accommodate 5,000 spectators.

Managerial history
  Haider Hassan
  Saeed Mohsen
  Haider Abbas

References

External links
 Afak SC on Goalzz.com

Football clubs in Al-Qādisiyyah